Paris–Troyes is an annual single-day road bicycle race in France between Paris and Troyes. First held in 1959, since 2005 it has been a 1.2 event on the UCI Europe Tour.

List of winners

References

External links
 

Cycle races in France
UCI Europe Tour races
Recurring sporting events established in 1959
1959 establishments in France